Degree abbreviations are used as an alternative way to specify an academic degree instead of spelling out the title in full, such as in reference books such as Who's Who and on business cards. Many degree titles have more than one possible abbreviation, with the abbreviation used varying between different universities. In the UK it is normal not to punctuate abbreviations for degrees with full stops (e.g. "BSc" rather than "B.Sc."), although this is done at some universities.

Overview 

The Frameworks for Higher Education Qualifications of UK Degree-Awarding Bodies lays down five levels of qualification with the title of degree: foundation (not in Scotland), ordinary and honours bachelor's (only separate levels in Scotland), master's and doctoral. These relate to specific outcome-based level descriptors and are tied to the Bologna Process.

It is common to put the name of the awarding institute in brackets after the degree abbreviation, e.g. BA (Lond).

Note that the lists below include historical degrees that may not currently be offered in British universities.

Anomalies 

For historical reasons some universities (the ancient universities of England and Scotland) do not fully adhere to the Framework (particularly with respect to the title of Master of Arts), and degrees in medicine, dentistry, and veterinary medicine are titled as bachelor's degrees despite being at master's level.

Undergraduate Master of Arts degrees 

The usage in the ancient universities is not consistent with the Framework or the Bologna Process. The ancient universities of England (Oxford and Cambridge) grant an MA degree that is not a substantive qualification but reflects the ancient practice of these universities of promoting BAs to MAs (and thus full membership of the University) a few years after graduating (see Master of Arts (Oxbridge and Dublin)). The ancient universities of Scotland award an undergraduate MA (see Scottish MA) instead of a BA. For students to obtain a master's degree consistent with the framework in these ancient English universities, they have created the MSt (Master of Studies) to address this anomaly and differentiate between the degrees, both master's.

The MAs from Aberdeen, Heriot-Watt, Glasgow, Edinburgh and St Andrews are considered bachelor's level qualifications on the Framework for Higher Education Qualifications and first cycle qualifications under the Bologna Process, while the Oxbridge MAs are considered "not academic qualifications" (the actual qualification being the BA).

Master's level bachelor's degrees 

Conversely, some bachelor's degrees in the "higher faculties" at the older universities in the UK (e.g. those other than arts at Oxford and Cambridge) are postgraduate qualifications (e.g. the BCL and BMus at Oxford). Many have been changed to the corresponding master's degree (e.g. BSc is now MSc at Oxford), but only within the last generation. The BD (Bachelor of Divinity) remains a higher degree at some universities (e.g. Oxford, Cambridge, St Andrews and, until recently, Durham) but is an undergraduate degree at most (e.g. London, Edinburgh, Aberdeen and Glasgow).

Bachelor's degrees in medicine, dentistry and veterinary science, while undergraduate degrees, are longer courses and are considered to be master's level qualifications in the Framework for Higher Education Qualifications and second cycle qualifications under the Bologna Process.

Bachelor/Master/Doctor of Philosophy 

There is an international (but not universal) custom that certain degrees will be designated '.... of Philosophy'. Examples are the BPhil (Bachelor of Philosophy), MPhil (Master of Philosophy) and PhD or DPhil (Doctor of Philosophy). Most recipients of such degrees have not engaged in a specialised study of academic philosophy - the degree is available for almost the whole range of disciplines. The origins lie in the ancient practice of regarding all areas of study as elements of 'philosophy' with its Greek meaning, 'friend of wisdom'. Thus holders of an MPhil degree may have earned it in any academic discipline.

Foundation level qualifications

These qualifications sit at level 5 (foundation level) of the Framework for Higher Education Qualifications and are short cycle (within or linked to the first cycle) qualifications under the Bologna Process.

See also Foundation degree.

 FdA - Foundation of Arts
 FDA - Foundation Degree of the Arts
 FDArts - Foundation Degree of the Arts
 FDEd - Foundation Degree of Education
 FdEng - Foundation of Engineering
 FDEng - Foundation Degree of Engineering
 FDS- Foundation Degree of Science
 FdSc - Foundation of Sciences

Bachelor's level qualifications

These qualifications sit at level 6 (bachelor's level) of the Framework for Higher Education Qualifications and are first cycle (end of cycle) qualifications under the Bologna Process.

Most British bachelor's degrees are honours degrees and indicated by putting "(Hons)" after the degree abbreviation. A student achieving a pass grade, below honours standard, may be awarded an "ordinary degree" or a "pass degree" and may not add "(Hons)".

As noted above, the MAs of the ancient universities of Scotland are also at this level and may also add "(Hons)" after their acronyms. Both these and bachelor's degrees with honours at Scottish universities are four-year courses at level 10 of the Framework for Qualifications of Higher Education Institutes in Scotland. Scottish bachelor's degrees without honours (including non-honours MAs from the ancient universities of Scotland) are three-year course with less specialisation (an Ordinary Degree or a General Degree) at level 9 of the Framework for Qualifications of Higher Education Institutes in Scotland.

Some of the following are postgraduate degrees in a few universities, but generally bachelors are undergraduate degrees.

 AgrB - Bachelor of Agriculture
 BA - Bachelor of Arts
 BA(Admin) - Bachelor of Arts in Administration
 BACom - Bachelor of Arts in Commerce
 BAEcon - Bachelor of Arts in Economics 
 BA(Ed) - Bachelor of Arts in Education
 BA(FS) - Bachelor of Arts in Financial Studies
 BAI - Bachelor of Arts in Engineering (Arte Ingeniaria)
 BAI(Elect) - Bachelor of Arts in Electrical Engineering
 BAI(Mech) - Bachelor of Arts in Mechanical Engineering
 BALaw - Bachelor of Arts in Law
 BAO - Bachelor of Arts in Obstetrics (Arte Obstetricia) 
 BARelSt - Bachelor of Arts on Religious Studies 
 BASc - Bachelor of Arts and Science
 BASoc - Bachelor of Arts in Sociology
 BATheol - Bachelor of Arts in Theology
 BA/BSc - Bachelor of Arts/Bachelor of Science
 BAcc - Bachelor of Accounting
 BAdmin - Bachelor of Administration
 BAgr - Bachelor of Agriculture
 BAH - Bachelor of Animal Health
 BArch - Bachelor of Architecture
 BArchSc - Bachelor of Architectural Science
 BBA - Bachelor of Business Administration
 BBLS - Bachelor of Business and Legal Studies
 BBS - Bachelor of Business Studies
 BBus - Bachelor of Business
 BChem - Bachelor of Chemistry 
 BCL - Bachelor of Civil Law
 BCLD(SocSc) - Bachelor of Community Learning and Development in Social Sciences
 BClinSci - Bachelor of Clinical Science
 BCom - Bachelor of Commerce
 BCombSt - Bachelor of Combined Studies
 BCommEdCommDev - Bachelor of Community Education and Community Development
 BComSc - Bachelor of Commercial Science 
 BD - Bachelor of Divinity
 BDes - Bachelor of Design
 BDiv - Bachelor of Divinity
 BEconSc - Bachelor of Economic Science
 BEconSci - Bachelor of Science in Economics
 BEd - Bachelor of Education
 BEng - Bachelor of Engineering
 BES - Bachelor of Engineering Studies
 BEng(Tech) - Bachelor of Engineering in Technology
 BEng/BSc - Bachelor of Engineering, Bachelor of Science
 BFA - Bachelor of Fine Art
 BFin - Bachelor of Finance
 BFLS - Bachelor of Financial and Legal Studies
 BFST - Bachelor of Food Science and Technology
 BH - Bachelor of Humanities
 BHealthSc - Bachelor of Health Sciences
 BHSc - Bachelor of Health Science
 BHy - Bachelor of Hygiene
 BIBA - Bachelor of International Business Administration
 BJur - Bachelor of Jurisprudence
 BL - Bachelor of Law
 BLE - Bachelor of Land Economy
 BLegSc - Bachelor of Legal Science
 BLib - Bachelor of Librarianship
 BLing - Bachelor of Linguistics
 BLitt - Bachelor of Letters or Bachelor of Literature
 BLittCelt - Bachelor of Celtic Letters
 BLS - Bachelor of Library Studies 
 BM - Bachelor of Medicine
 BM - Bachelor of Midwifery
 BMedSc - Bachelor of Medical Science(s)
 BMedSci - Bachelor in Medical Science
 BMet - Bachelor of Metallurgy
 BMid - Bachelor of Midwifery
 BMidWif - Bachelor of Midwifery
 BMin - Bachelor of Ministry
 BMS - Bachelor of Midwifery Studies
 BMSc - Bachelor of Medical Science
 BMus - Bachelor of Music
 BMusEd - Bachelor of Music Education
 BMusPerf - Bachelor of Music Performance
 BN - Bachelor of Nursing
 BNatSci - Bachelor in Natural Science
 BNS - Bachelor of Nursing Studies
 BNurs - Bachelor of Nursing
 BOptom - Bachelor of Optometry
 BOst - Bachelor of Osteopathy
 BPA - Bachelor of Public Administration
 BPA - Bachelor of Performing Arts
 BPharm - Bachelor of Pharmacy
 BPhil - Bachelor of Philosophy
 BPhil(Ed) - Bachelor of Philosophy in Education
 BPhys - Bachelor of Physics
 BPhysio - Bachelor of Physiotherapy
 BPl - Bachelor of Planning
 BRadiog - Bachelor of Radiography
 BSc - Bachelor of Science 
 BScAgr - Bachelor of Science in Agriculture
 BSc(Dairy) - Bachelor of Science in Dairying
 BScD - Bachelor of Science in Dentistry
 BSc(DomSc) - Bachelor of Science in Domestic Science
 BScEc - Bachelor of Science in Economic and Social Studies
 BScEcon - Bachelor of Science in Economic Science or Bachelor of Economic and Social Studies
 BSc(Econ) - Bachelor of Science in Economics
 BSc(Ed) - Bachelor of Science in Education
 BSc(Eng) - Bachelor of Science in Engineering
 BScFor - Bachelor of Science in Forestry 
 BScHW - Bachelor of Science in Health and Wellbeing
 BSc(HealthSc) - Bachelor of Science in Health Science
 BSc(Hort) - Bachelor of Science in Horticulture
 BSc(MCRM) - Bachelor of Science in Marine and Coastal Reserve Management
 BSc(Med) - Bachelor of Science in Medicine
 BSc(Mid) - Bachelor of Science in Midwifery
 BSc(Min) - Bachelor of Science in Mining
 BSc(Psych) - Bachelor of Science in Psychology 
 BScHSc - Bachelor of Science in Health Sciences
 BScPH - Bachelor of Science in Public Health 
 BScTech - Bachelor of Science in Technology
 BSocSc - Bachelor of Social Sciences
 BSS - Bachelor of Social Studies
 BSt - Bachelor of Studies
 BStSu - Bachelor of Deaf Studies
 BSW - Bachelor of Social Work 
 BTCP - Bachelor of Town and County Planning
 BTech - Bachelor of Technology (not to be confused with BTEC)
 BTechEd - Bachelor of Technological Education
 BTh - Bachelor of Theology
 BTheol - Bachelor of Theology
 BTS - Bachelor of Theatre Studies
 EdB - Bachelor of Education
 LittB - Bachelor of Literature or Bachelor of Letters
 LLB - Bachelor of Laws
 LLB(Eur) Bachelor of Laws (European)
 MA - Master of Arts (bachelor's level at some Scottish universities)
 MA(SocSci) - Master of Arts (Social Sciences)
 MusB - Bachelor of Music
 ScBTech - Bachelor of Science in Technology

Master's level qualifications

These qualifications sit at level 7 (master's level) of the Framework for Higher Education Qualifications and are second cycle qualifications under the Bologna Process.

Undergraduate-entry degrees

Undergraduate-entry "Integrated master's" degrees are offered with honours, and so may add (hons) after the degree abbreviation. These are substantive master's degrees integrating undergraduate and master's level study, with the final qualification being at the same level as postgraduate master's.

Primary qualifications in medicine, dentistry and veterinary medicine are taken as undergraduate-entry courses and are denominated bachelor's degrees, but are normally offered without honours These are also qualifications at the same level as postgraduate master's degrees, but retain the name of bachelor's for historical reasons. The Bachelors of Medicine and Surgery are always taken together as the primary medical qualification in the UK, equivalent to the American MD.

Note that where there is a similarly titled postgraduate master's degree, the formulation " Master in ..." is used for the undergraduate degree and "Master of ..." for the postgraduate degree (e.g. MArt/MA, MSci/MSc). Where there is no equivalent postgraduate degree, either "in" or "of" is used.

Integrated master's degrees

 MAcc - Master in Accountancy
 MAccFin - Master of Accounting and Finance
 MAnth - Master in Anthropology
 MArabic - Master of Arabic Studies
 MArc - Master of Archaeology
 MArch - Master of Architecture
 MArt - Master in Arts
 MART - Master of Art
 MBio - Master of Biomedical Sciences, Master of Biological Sciences
 MBiochem - Master of Biochemistry
 MBiol - Master of Biology or Master in Biological Sciences
 MBiolSci - Master of Biological Science
 MBiomed - Master in Biomedical Sciences
 MBioMedSci - Master of Biomedical Science
 MBioms - Master of Biomedical Sciences
 MBus - Master in Business and Management or Master of Business
 MChD - Master in Dental Surgery
 MChem - Master of Chemistry
 MChemPhys - Master of Chemical Physics
 MChiro - Master of Chiropractic
 MClass - Master of Classical Studies
 MClassL - Master of Classical Languages
 MComp - Master of Computer Science or Master of Computing
 MCompPhil - Master of Computer Science and Philosophy
 MCompSci - Master of Computer Science
 MComSC - Master of Community and Social Care
 M.CMAc - Master of Chinese Medicine, Acupuncture
 MCreW - Master of Creative Writing
 MDiv - Master of Divinity
 MDes - Master of Design
 MDrama - Master of Drama and Theatre Studies
 MEarthPhys - Master of Earth Physics
 MEarthSci - Master of Earth Science
 MEdStud - Master of Education Studies
 MEcol - Master of Ecology
 MEcon - Master of Economics
 MEng - Master of Engineering
 MEngLit - Master of English
 MEnv - Master of Environmental Science
 MEnvSc - Master of Environmental Science
 MESci - Master of Earth Science
 MFin - Master of Finance
 MFor - Master of Forestry
 MGeog - Master of Geography
 MGeogSCI - Master of Geographical Science
 MGeol - Master of Geology
 MGeophys - Master of Geophysics
 MGeoSci - Master in Geology
 MHist - Master of History
 MHRM - Master of Human Resource Management
 MInf - Master of Informatics
 MLA - Master of Landscape Architecture
 MLang - Master of Languages
 MLaw - Master of Law
 MLibArts - Master of Liberal Arts
 MLing - Master of Linguistics
 MMarBiol - Master of Marine Biology
 MMark - Master in Marketing
 MMath - Master of Mathematics
 MMath&Phys - Master of Mathematics and Physics
 MMathCompSci - Master of Mathematics and Computer Science
 MMathPhil - Master of Mathematics and Philosophy
 MMathPhys - Master of Mathematics and Physics  
 MMathStat - Master of Mathematics and Statistics
 MMBiol - Master of Marine Biology
 MME - Master of Mechanical Engineering
 MMedSci - Master of Medical Science
 MMet - Master of Meteorology
 MMkt - Master in Marketing
 MMorse - Master of Mathematics, Operational Research, Statistics and Economics 
 MMSc - Master of Marine Science
 MNatSc - Master of Natural Science
 MNeuro - Master in Neuroscience
 MNeuroSci - Master of Neuroscience
 MNSW - Master of Nursing and Social Work
 MNurs - Master of Nursing
 MNursSci - Master of Nursing Science
 MNutr - Master of Nutrition
 MOcean - Master of Oceanography
 MOptom - Master of  Optometry
 MOSci - Master of Ocean Science
 MOst - Master of Osteopathy
 M.Ost. - Master of Osteopathy
 MPharm - Master of Pharmacy
 MPharmacol - Master of Pharmacology
 MPhilSt - Master of Philosophical Studies
 MPhyPhil - Master of Physics and Philosophy
 MPhys - Master of Physics
 MPhysio - Master of Physiotherapy
 MPhysPhil - Master of Physics and Philosophy
 MPlan - Master of Town and Regional Planning
 MPLAN - Master of Planning
 MPol - Master of Politics and International Relations
 MPsych - Master of Psychology
 MRelSt - Master of Religious Studies
 MSci - Master in Science (Master of Natural Sciences at Cambridge)
 MScOT or MScOccTher - Master of Science in Occupational Therapy
 MSLT - Master of Speech and Language Therapy
 MSoc - Master of Sociology
 MSocStud - Master of Social Studies
 MSPRT - Master of Sport
 MStat - Master of Statistics
 MTheatre - Master of Theatre
 MTheol - Master in Theology
 MTCP - Master of Town and Country Planning
 MVetPhys - Master of Veterinary Physiotherapy
 MZOOL - Master of Zoology

Primary dental qualifications

 BChD - Bachelor of Dental Surgery
 BDOS - Bachelor of Dental and Oral Sciences
 BDS - Bachelor of Dental Surgery
 DDS - Doctor of Dental Surgery

Primary medical qualifications

 BMBS - Bachelors of Medicine and Surgery or Bachelor of Medicine, Bachelor of Surgery
 BMBCh - Bachelors of Medicine and Surgery
 MB, BChir - Bachelor of Medicine and Bachelor of Surgery
 MBBCh - Bachelor of Medicine, Bachelor of Surgery
 MBBS - Bachelors of Medicine and Surgery or Bachelor of Medicine, Bachelor of Surgery
 MBChB - Bachelors of Medicine and Surgery or Bachelor of Medicine, Bachelor of Surgery 
 MD - Doctor of Medicine

Primary veterinary qualifications

 BVS - Bachelor of Veterinary Surgery
 BVetM - Bachelor of Veterinary Medicine
 BVetMed - Bachelor of Veterinary Medicine
 BVM&S - Bachelor of Veterinary Medicine and Surgery
 BVMBVS - Bachelor of Veterinary Medicine, Bachelor of Veterinary Science
 BVMedSci - Bachelor of Veterinary Medical Science
 BVMS - Bachelor of Veterinary Medicine
 BVMSci - Bachelor of Veterinary Medicine and Science
 BVSc - Bachelor of Veterinary Science 
 VetMB - Bachelor of Veterinary Medicine

Postgraduate degrees

Postgraduate master's degrees may be either taught degrees or research degrees. Taught master's degrees may be awarded by an institution with taught degree awarding powers; master's degrees by research (e g MPhil, MRes), where over half of the student's effort is in original research, require research degree awarding powers. Postgraduate degrees are not normally honours degrees and thus do not add "(Hons)". Some degrees may be offered as either integrated master's or postgraduate master's courses at different institutes, e.g. MEng and MArch.

A few postgraduate degrees at Oxford are titled as bachelor's degrees. These are, nonetheless, master's level qualifications.

 BCL - Bachelor of Civil Law (Oxford)
 BPhil - Bachelor of Philosophy (Oxford)
 EMBS - European Master in Business Sciences
 LLM - Master of Laws (Master of Law at Cambridge)
 LLM(Res) Master of Laws (Research)
 MA - Master of Arts
 MArch - Master of Architecture
 MASt - Master of Advanced Study
 MBA - Master of Business Administration
 MBL - Master of Business and Law
 MComp - Master of Composition
 MCD - Master of Civic Design
 MCh - Master of Surgery
 MCL - Master of Corporate Law
 MClinDent - Master of Clinical Dentistry
 MDes - Master of Design
 MEd - Master of Education
 MEng - Master of Engineering
 MEng(Eur) - Master of Engineering (European)
 MEP - Master of Educational Practice
 MFA - Master of Fine Art
 HMHW - Higher Master in Health and Wellbeing
 MJur - Master of Jurisprudence (Law) (Magister Juris at Oxford)
 MLib - Master of Librarianship
 MLit - Master of Literature
 MLitt - Master of Letters
 MMin - Master of Ministry
 MMus - Master of Music
 MPA - Master of Public Administration
 MPerf - Master of Performance
 MPH - Master of Public Health
 MPhil - Master of Philosophy (under the Framework, the MPhil is "normally reserved" for longer master's courses with a significant research element, or for PhD candidates who do not reach sufficient level for the award of a doctorate
 MPP - Master of Public Policy
 MProf - Master of Professional Studies or Master of Professional Practice 
 MRes - Master in Research
 MbyRes - Master by Research
 MSc - Master of Science
 MSc(Eur) - Master of Science (European)
 MScEcon - Master of Economic and Social Studies
 MScD - Master of Science in Dental Science
 MScHW - Master of Science in Health and Wellbeing
 MSt - Master of Studies
 MSW - Master of Social Work
 MTeach - Master of Teaching
 MTL - Master of Teaching and Learning
 MTh - Master of Theology
 MTheol - Master of Theology
 MUniv - Master of the University (the MUniv is only ever an honorary degree)
 MusM - Master of Music

Doctoral degrees

UK doctoral degrees are at level 8 of the Framework for Higher Education Qualifications and are third cycle qualifications under the Bologna Process. All doctoral degrees include "original research or other advanced scholarship" demonstrating "the creation and interpretation of new knowledge".

Due to the flexibility of Latin word order, there are two schools in the abbreviation of doctor's degrees. The two ancient universities of England split on this: at Cambridge, D follows the faculty (e.g. PhD, LittD.), while at Oxford the D precedes the faculty (e.g. DPhil, DLitt). Most universities in the UK followed Oxford for the higher doctorates but followed international precedent in using PhD for Doctor of Philosophy and professional doctorates.

The Framework for Higher Education Qualifications lays down the naming convention that Doctor of Philosophy is reserved for doctorates awarded on the basis of examination by thesis or publication, or by artefact, composition or performance accompanied by written academic commentary. Other doctorates (typically styled professional or specialist doctorates) that have substantial taught elements normally include the field in the name of the degree.

Higher doctorates  are normally awarded as honorary degrees (honoris causa), but can also be awarded on the basis of a substantial body of published work. DUniv is only ever an honorary degree. Some degrees awarded as higher doctorates by one institution may be awarded as professional doctorates by another (e.g. EngD).

Professional / specialist doctorates

 AdminD - Doctor of Administration
 AMusD - Doctor of Musical Arts
 ClinPsyD - Doctor of Clinical Psychology
 DAHP - Doctor of Advanced Healthcare Practice
 DAP - Doctor of Academic Practice
 DAppEdPsy - Doctor of Applied Educational Psychology
 DBA - Doctor of Business Administration
 DBAEngTech - Doctor of Business Administration Engineering Technology
 DBL - Doctor of Business Leadership
 DBS - Doctor of Biomedical Science
 DClinPrac - Doctor of Clinical Practice
 DClinPsy  - Doctor of Clinical Psychology
 DClinPsych - Doctor of Clinical Psychology or Doctor of Clinical and Community Psychology
 DCouns - Doctor of Counselling
 DDP - Doctor of Design Practice
 DDS - Doctor of Dental Surgery
 DEd - Doctor of Education
 DEdChPsy - Doctor of Educational and Child Psychology
 DEdPsy - Doctor of Educational Psychology
 DEng - Doctor of Engineering (awarded as a higher doctorate by some universities)
 DFin - Doctor of Finance
 DFT - Doctor of Family Therapy
 DForenPsy - Doctor of Forensic Psychology
 DHealthPsy - Doctor of Health Psychology
 DHC - Doctor of Health Care
 DHS - Doctor of Health Studies
 DHSc - Doctor of Health Science
 DHum - Doctor of Humanities
 DHy - Doctor of Hygiene
 DLang - Doctor of Languages
 DM - Doctor of Medicine (awarded by thesis at some universities; awarded as a higher doctorate at some universities)
 DMA - Doctor of Musical Arts
 DMan - Doctor of Management
 DMet - Doctor of Metallurgy
 DMin - Doctor of Ministry
 DMus - Doctor of Music (awarded as a higher doctorate at some universities) 
 DMW - Doctor of Midwifery
 DNurs - Doctor of Nursing
 DNursSc - Doctor of Nursing Science
 DOccTher - Doctor of Occupational Therapy
 DOT - Doctor of Occupational Therapy
 DPA - Doctor of Public Administration
 DPH - Doctor of Public Health
 DProf - Doctor of Professional Studies
 DProfCounsPsy - Professional Doctorate in Counseling Psychology 
 DProfHW - Professional Doctorate in Health and Wellbeing
 DPS  - Doctor of Professional Studies
 DPT - Doctor of Physiotherapy
 DPhysio - Doctor of Physiotherapy
 DPT - Doctor of Physical Therapy 
 DPT - Doctor of Practical Theology or Practical Theology Doctorate
 DSocCare - Doctor of Social Care
 DSportExPsy - Doctor of Sport and Exercise Psychology
 DSportExSci - Doctor of Applied Sport and Exercise Science
 DSW - Doctor of Social Work
 DTh - Doctor of Practical Theology
 DThM - Doctor of Theology and Ministry
 DTour - Doctor of Tourism
 EdChPsychD - Doctor of Educational and Child Psychology
 EdD - Doctor of Education
 EDD - Professional Doctorate in Education
 EdPsychD - Doctor of Educational Psychology
 EngD - Doctor of Engineering or Engineering Doctorate
 EntD - Doctor of Enterprise
 HScD - Doctor of Health Science
 JD - Juris Doctor
 MD - Doctor of Medicine (awarded by thesis at some universities; awarded as a higher doctorate at some universities)
 MusD - Doctor of Music (awarded as a higher doctorate at some universities)
 PsychD - Doctor of Psychology
 SocSciD - Doctor of Social Sciences
 SocScD - Doctor of Social Science
 SPPD - Doctor of Social and Public Policy
 ThD - Doctor of Theology

Doctorates by thesis or composition

 DDS - Doctor of Dental Surgery
 DNursSci -Doctor in Nursing Science
 DPhil - Doctor of Philosophy
 MD - Doctor of Medicine
 MD(Res) - Doctor of Medicine (Research)
 PhD - Doctor of Philosophy

Higher and honorary degrees

 DCh - Doctor of Surgery
 DCL - Doctor of Civil Law
 DD - Doctor of Divinity
 DDS – Doctor of Dental Surgery
 DDSc - Doctor of Dental Science
 DEd – Doctor of Education
 DHL - Doctor of Humane Letters
 DLitt - Doctor of Letters
 DLit - Doctor of Literature
 DLit(Ed) - Doctor of Literature (Education)
 DM - Doctor of Medicine
 DMus - Doctor of Music
 Hon DMus - Honorary Doctor of Music
 Dr.h.c. or Dr.(h.c.) - Doctor honoris causa
 DSc - Doctor of Science
 DSc(Econ) - Doctor of Science (Economics)
 DSc(Eng) - Doctor of Science (Engineering)
 DSc(Med) - Doctor of Science (Medicine)
 DSc (Social Science) – Doctor of Science in Social Science
 DScEcon - Doctor of Economic and Social  Studies
 DTech - Doctor of Technology
 DUniv - Doctor of the University
 DVM&S - Doctor of Veterinary Medicine and Surgery
 EngD - Doctor of Engineering
 LittD - Doctor of Letters
 LLD - Doctor of Laws
 ScD - Doctor of Science
 MA(h.c.) - Honorary Master of Arts (Oxford, Dublin and Cambridge)

See also 
 Post-nominal letters
 Foundation degree
 List of British Universities
 Degrees of the University of Oxford
 British undergraduate degree classification

References

Academic degrees of the United Kingdom
Degree